A total solar eclipse occurred on March 20, 2015. A solar eclipse occurs when the Moon passes between Earth and the Sun, thereby totally or partly obscuring the image of the Sun for a viewer on Earth. A total solar eclipse occurs when the Moon's apparent diameter is larger than the Sun's, blocking all direct sunlight, turning day into darkness. Totality occurs in a narrow path across Earth's surface, with a partial solar eclipse visible over a surrounding region thousands of kilometres wide. This total solar eclipse is notable in that the path of totality passed over the North Pole. Totality was visible in the Faroe Islands and Svalbard.

It had a magnitude of 1.0445. The longest duration of totality was 2 minutes and 47 seconds off the coast of the Faroe Islands. It was the last total solar eclipse visible in Europe until the eclipse of August 12, 2026.

The track of totality passed across the North Atlantic and into the Arctic Ocean.

Event
The solar eclipse began at 08:30 GMT in northwest Europe and moved towards the northeast but still in northern Europe. It was most visible from the North Atlantic and Arctic Oceans, Greenland, Iceland, Ireland, the United Kingdom, Faroe Islands, northern Norway and Murmansk Oblast. The shadow began its pass off the south coast of Greenland. It then moved to the northeast, passing between Iceland and the United Kingdom before moving over the Faroe Islands and the northernmost islands of Norway. The shadow of the eclipse was visible in varying degrees all over Europe.
For example, London experienced an 86.8% partial solar eclipse while points north of the Faroe Islands in the Norwegian Sea saw a complete solar eclipse. Three chartered airliners flew above the clouds, giving passengers a slightly prolonged view.

The eclipse was observed at radio frequencies at the Metsähovi Radio Observatory, Finland, where a partial eclipse was seen. The eclipse was also observed by meteorological satellite Meteosat-10.

Impact

The European Union has a solar power output of about 90 gigawatts and production could have been temporarily decreased by up to 34 GW of that dependent on the clarity of the sky. In actuality the dip was less than expected, with a 13 GW drop in Germany happening due to overcast skies. This was the first time that an eclipse had a significant impact on the power system, and the electricity sector took measures to mitigate the impact. The power gradient (change in power) may be −400 MW/minute and +700 MW/minute. Places in Netherlands, Belgium and Denmark may be 85.2% obscured. Temperature may decrease by 3 °C, and wind power may decrease as winds are reduced by 0.7 m/s.

Coincidence of events
In addition to the eclipse, 20 March 2015 was also the day of the March equinox (also known as the spring or vernal equinox in the Northern Hemisphere). In addition, six supermoons were expected for 2015. The supermoon on 20 March 2015 was the third of the year; however, it was a new moon (near side facing away from the sun), and only its shadow was visible.

At greatest eclipse, the Sun was at its zenith less than 24 kilometers south of the Equator. Greatest eclipse occurred at 09:45:39 UTC of Friday, March 20, 2015 while March Equinox occurred at 22:45:09 UTC, just under 13 hours after the greatest eclipse (Greatest eclipse occurred in winter, 13 hours before spring).

Religious Significance

Proponents of the Blood Moon Prophecy, such as Bob O'Dell also pointed out that 20 March 2015 was also a significant day on the Jewish and Biblical calendar. That evening was the onset of the Hebrew month of Nisan, the first month in the Biblical calendar year. Furthermore, the path of the total eclipse over the North Pole was a highly symbolic location infusing the day with both great natural significance and profound religious meaning according to O'Dell. Due to the significance of the eclipse, a global prayer event in Jerusalem was organized that day.

Eclipse visibility
The event was visible as a partial eclipse all across Europe including: Norway, Sweden, Denmark, the United Kingdom, Ireland, Portugal, France, Germany, Poland, Czech Republic, Hungary, Austria, Italy, Montenegro, Finland, Western Russia, and Ukraine.

Simulation

Related eclipses

Eclipses of 2015 
 A total solar eclipse on March 20.
 A total lunar eclipse on April 4.
 A partial solar eclipse on September 13.
 A total lunar eclipse on September 28.

Solar eclipses descending node 2015-2018 

 Saros 120: Total Solar Eclipse March 20, 2015
 Saros 130: Total Solar Eclipse March 8–9, 2016
 Saros 140: Annular Solar Eclipse February 26, 2017
 Saros 150: Partial Solar Eclipse February 15, 2018

Lunar eclipses
A total lunar eclipse followed on April 4, 2015, visible over Australia, and the Pacific coast of Asia and North America.

Solar eclipses 2015–2018

Saros series

Metonic series

References

Bibliography
 NASA graphics
 Google interactive map of the eclipse from NASA
 NASA Besselian Elements – Partial Solar Eclipse of 2007 September 11

External links

 Northern Equinox Eclipse, APOD 3/21/2015, totality of Longyearbyen, Svalbald
 A Double Eclipse of the Sun, International Space Station moving in front of the eclipsed sun, APOD 3/22/2015, partial eclipse of Fregenal de la Sierra, Spain
 Diamond Rings and Baily's Beads, APOD 3/28/2015, totality of Longyearbyen, Svalbald
 Corona from Svalbard, APOD 3/31/2015

Eclipse spectacle AstroBob, 3/20/15

2015 in Europe
2015 in science
2015 03 20
2015 03 20
March 2015 events
2015 in Iceland